Derthona Basket,  known for sponsorship reasons as Bertram Derthona Tortona, is an Italian professional basketball team of the city of Tortona, in the province of Alessandria, Piedmont. 

The team has achieved the promotion to the Lega Basket Serie A (LBA) after the end of the 2020–21 season of the Serie A2 Basket.

History

1955–2014: Decades within minor leagues
Derthona Basket was founded in 1955 in Tortona, a small town near Alessandria; however the club was later dissolved in 1962, only four years after obtaining the affiliation with the Italian Basketball Federation (FIP). In 1965, Derthona was refounded within the newly formed multisport club of the town.

After decades in the minor leagues, in 2008, Tortona signed the Macedonian point guard, Petar Naumoski. With the Macedonian champion, the team achieved the promotion to Serie C1, ending the season unbeaten. In the 2013–14 season, Derthona, led by coach Antonello Arioli, was the protagonist of an extraordinary season, which saw the so-called Lions at the top of the standings from the beginning to end of the season. One of the greatest moments of that year occurred on 19 January 2014 in the historic PalaDozza in Bologna, where Derthona beat Fortitudo Bologna 61-83. The team won the playoffs, defeating Legnano Basket Knights in the finals and reaching the Serie A2.

2014–2018: Years in the second league
In the 2015–16 season, Derthona arrived third in the West Group, qualifying for the playoffs, where it eliminated 3–1 Pallacanestro Trieste in the first round, while in the quarterfinals it lost 3–2 against Pallacanestro Brescia. In the 2016–17 season, led by coach Demis Cavina, Derthona ended the regular season at the second place in the West Group, qualifying for the playoffs where it ousted 3–1 Pallacanestro Mantovana in the first round, but it was eliminated in the quarterfinals by Trieste for 3–1.

On 4 March 2018, Derthona won his first official title, the Italian LNP Cup, defeating Basket Ravenna 89–57. The team, coached by Lorenzo Pansa, qualyfied for the playoffs, ending the regular season at the fifth place in the West Group. However, the Lions were eliminated in the first round 3-1 by Udine.

2018–present: Ramondino era
On 22 October 2018, after three defeats in the first three games of the season, Derthona sacked Lorenzo Pansa and, on the following day, signed Marco Ramondino as the new head coach of the team. On 29 September 2019, Derthona won its second official title, the LNP Supercup, defeating Basket Torino 81–84.

In the 2020–21 season, Derthona ended the regular season at the second place. In the playoffs, the Lions defeated 3–2 Ravenna in the quarterfinals and 3–1 Eurobasket Roma in the semifinals. On 29 June 2021, led by important American players like Jamarr Sanders and Jalen Cannon, as well as the young Italian pointguard Bruno Mascolo, Derthona defeated Torino 3–2 in the national finals, reaching the Serie A for the first time in its history.

In the following summer, the entrepreneur Beniamino Gavio, who already sponsored the team in the previous season with his luxury yachts company Bertram Yachts, became the new owner of the club. During the first season in the top league, the team confirmed the backbone of the roster, but signed also good international players like J. P. Macura, Chris Wright, Tyler Cain and Mike Daum, as well as the Italian-Argentine veteran Ariel Filloy. The Lions took part in the 2022 Italian Basketball Cup, defeating Trieste 94–82 and Virtus Bologna 94–82, reaching the finals, where it lost against Olimpia Milano 78–61. Derthona ended the season at the fourth place and, after having defeated Reyer Venezia in the playoffs' quarterfinals by 3–1, it lost against Virtus by 3–0.

Honours
Italian Cup
 Runners-up (1): 2021–22 
Italian LNP Cup
Winners (1): 2018
Italian LNP Supercup
Winners (1): 2019

Players

Current roster

Depth chart

References

External links 
 Official Site 

1955 establishments in Italy
Basketball teams established in 1955
Basketball teams in Piedmont